The Château de Montaiguillon is a ruined castle in the commune of Louan-Villegruis-Fontaine in the Seine-et-Marne département of France.

The castle dates from the 12th century. Partially ruined and abandoned, it is privately owned. It has been listed since 1875 as a monument historique by the French Ministry of Culture.

See also
List of castles in France

References

External links
 

Ruined castles in Île-de-France
Buildings and structures in Seine-et-Marne
Monuments historiques of Île-de-France